"No Better" is a song by New Zealand singer-songwriter Lorde, taken from the extended version of her debut studio album Pure Heroine (2013). The track was released on 13 December 2013 by Universal Music Group as a promotional tool for the album. "No Better" is an electropop and trip hop ballad with elements of hip hop, in which Lorde discusses an infatuation. Music critics opined that the single has similar musical style to songs from Pure Heroine.

Background and composition

"No Better" was written by Lorde (credited under her birth-name Ella Yelich-O'Connor) and Joel Little. On 13 December 2013, the track was released as a digital download single on the iTunes Store. The single was made available for free until 19 December as a part of the iTunes Store's "12 Days of Gifts" Christmas promotion.

"No Better" is an electropop and trip hop ballad with hip hop elements. The song has a similar sonority to that of other songs from Pure Heroine, featuring Lorde's "feathery" vocals and minimal production. It incorporates "woozy" basslines, and "pulsing" synthesisers in its instrumentation, making the song's melody "dreamy", according to Whitney Phaneuf of HitFix. Lyrically, the song features Lorde "[celebrating] an infatuation that deepens as the seasons change". At the first verse, she sings "We roll in every summer when there's strength in our numbers / And your breath's hot and gross but I kiss you like a lover". During the chorus the bass beat becomes more intense as Lorde sings "Go all the way / Have your fun, have it all".

Reception 
Marc Hogan from Spin wrote that the song "flits between fairly vivid first-person details", while Whitney Phaneuf from HitFix labelled "No Better" a "sexy" track. Eric Danton of Rolling Stone opined that the lyrics of the song are "girlish and knowing". Writing for Slate, L. V. Anderson shared that "No Better" is reminiscent of some of the best tracks on Pure Heroine, but also "lighter, simpler [...] and more confectionary than most of her debut album", in spite of its dark theme. "No Better" entered the New Zealand Artists Singles Chart at number seven on 23 December 2013. It dropped to number nineteen the following week, before falling out of the chart.

Track listing 
Digital download
"No Better" – 2:50
"Royals"  – 4:03

Release history

References

Notes

Citations 

2010s ballads
2013 singles
2013 songs
Electropop ballads
Lorde songs
Songs written by Lorde
Songs written by Joel Little
Trip hop songs
Song recordings produced by Joel Little